Pigmartyr (2004) is an album by Raymond Watts, a.k.a. PIG.  This was the first album he signed as "Watts" instead of "PIG". The First copies (approx. 500) were signed and numbered by Raymond Watts. The album was remastered and rereleased through Metropolis under the title Pigmata in 2005, as a PIG album, with three additional tracks mixed by Isaac Glendening of Cesium 137.

Album information
Raymond Watts' first release since 1999's Genuine American Monster, Pigmartyr is a bit of a departure from typical Pig material.  Gone are most of the bombastic string sections and orchestral influence, Pigmartyr takes a turn toward the hard rock side, and has a much more raw and stripped down feel.

The album was largely recorded in London, UK with a number of collaborators, including a duet ("Take") with glamorous UK rockchick Harry (aka Dirty Harry) and a couple of co-writes ("Situation" and "Here To Stay") with Marc Heal of Cubanate.

Pigmartyr was originally planned as a PIG band album under the title Lust for Lard. After a series of drawn-out recording sessions and release date changes, it was eventually released by Grand Recordings as a "Watts" album in summer 2004.

Track listing

Original UK release
 "Suck Spit Shit" 5:28
 "Here To Stay" 3:33
 "Reject" 3:53
 "Situation" 3:39
 "Kundalini" 5:44
 "Vitriol Vice and Virtue" 5:16
 "Take" 5:04
 "Arbor Vitate" 4:33
 "Stage Slut" 4:20
 "Junky" 6:03

Remastered US release
 "Suck Spit Shit" – 5:29
 "Here To Stay" – 3:31
 "Reject" – 3:51
 "Situation" – 3:38
 "Kundalini" – 5:46
 "Vitriol Vice & Virtue" – 5:15
 "Take" – 5:01
 "Arbor Vitate" – 4:33
 "Stage Slut" – 4:20
 "Junky" – 6:04
 "God Rod" – 5:27
 "On the Slaughterfront" – 6:46
 "Filth Healer" – 5:21

Personnel
 Raymond Watts – vocals, guitars, programming
 Martin Eden – bass, programming, backing vocals
 Steve White – guitars, programming
 Jules Hodgeson – guitars
 Andy Selway – drums
 Arianne Schreiber – backing vocals
 Isaac Glendening - re-mastering

with

 Marc Heal – additional programming on "Situation" and "Here To Stay"
 Harry – vocals on "Take"
 Bryan Black – backing vocals on "Junky"
 Oliver Grasset – additional programming on "Junky"
 Jules Cooper – additional guitars

Album information
Under Grand Recordings, Pigmartyr was not mastered and many people could not get the album. It was soon remastered and re-released under Metropolis Records under the PIG moniker and a new title, Pigmata. Raymond recorded three bonus songs for the album as well as having Isaac Glendening of Cesium 137 mix them. The album went on to become a rather large success at Metropolis Records, keeping the #1 spot on Metropolis' best seller list for several weeks.

References

Pig (musical project) albums
2004 albums
Metropolis Records albums